Thomas Offenberg Backer (27 September 1892 in Telemark Norway  – 10 January 1987) was a Norwegian engineer.

Early life
Thomas Offenberg Backer was born at Mo in Telemark, Norway. He was the son of Hans Backer (1858–1940) and Johanne Offenberg (1859–1954). The father was a parish priest. His brother of Andreas Backer was secretary-general for the Norwegian Trekking Association.  He was married in 1918 with Clara Martens (1895–1988).

Career
Backer graduated from the Norwegian Institute of Technology as siv.ing. in 1914. From 1948 to 1962 he served as director of the Norwegian Directorate of Public Roads. As a road director, Backer completed the restoration of war damaged bridges and roads resulting during the Nazi occupation of Norway during World War II.

He had formerly worked as a district engineer for the Norwegian Public Roads Administration in Vestfold and in Oppland.

Private life
Backer died during 1987 and was buried at Vestre gravlund in Oslo.

References

1892 births
1987 deaths
People from Tokke
Directors of government agencies of Norway
Norwegian Institute of Technology alumni
Directorate of Public Roads people
Burials at Vestre gravlund
20th-century Norwegian engineers
20th-century Norwegian civil servants